"Lie in Our Graves" is a song by the Dave Matthews Band, featured on the 1996 album Crash.

Official live releases
This is a partial list of albums which have featured "Lie in Our Graves" as a live track.

Live at Red Rocks 8.15.95
Summer 1995 tour show from Red Rocks Amphitheatre in Morrison, Colorado
Special guest performer Tim Reynolds
Live in Chicago 12.19.98
Fall 1998 tour show from the United Center in Chicago
Special guest performers Tim Reynolds, Victor Wooten, Maceo Parker, and Mitch Rutman
The Gorge
3-night Summer 2002 tour stand from the Gorge Amphitheatre in George, Washington
The Complete Weekend on the Rocks
4-night Summer 2005 tour stand from Red Rocks Amphitheatre in Morrison, Colorado
Live Trax Vol. 2
2004 benefit show from Polo Field in San Francisco's Golden Gate Park
Special guest performer Carlos Santana
Live Trax Vol. 4
1996 official Crash release show from the Classic Amphitheater at Richmond's International Raceway
Live Trax Vol. 7
1996 New Year's Run show from Hampton Coliseum in Hampton, Virginia
Special guest performers Béla Fleck and the Flecktones and Paul McCandless
Live Trax Vol. 10
2007 International Spring tour show from Pavilhão Atlântico in Lisbon, Portugal
Special guest performer Tom Morello
Live Trax Vol. 18
2006 First full band performance in the United States after a tour in Europe from Virginia Beach Amphitheatre in Virginia Beach, Virginia

References

External links
DMB Almanac Listing
Guitar Tabs @ DMBTabs.com
Lyrics and Song History @ antsmarching.org

Dave Matthews Band songs
1996 songs
Songs written by Dave Matthews
Song recordings produced by Steve Lillywhite
Songs written by Boyd Tinsley
Songs written by Stefan Lessard
Songs written by LeRoi Moore
Songs written by Carter Beauford